Sarab-e Kian (also Romanized as Sarāb-e Kīān and Sarāb-e Kayān; also known as Keyān-e ‘Olyā, Khayūn, Kīān-e Bālā, Kīyān Bālā, and Sagwān) is a village in Zagheh Rural District, Zagheh District, Khorramabad County, Lorestan Province, Iran. At the 2006 census, its population was 34, in 4 families.

References 

Towns and villages in Khorramabad County